Breeza is a locality in New South Wales, Australia. The area around Breeza in particular is called the "Breeza Plains". The name "Breeza" may be derived from an Aboriginal word meaning "one hill".

References

External links
 Breeza Information - website
 Breeza Travel Australia -  website
 River conditions - Mooki River at Breeza

Gunnedah Shire
towns in New South Wales